Moville Community College is a secondary school based in Carrownaff, Moville, County Donegal, Ireland. It has approximately 600 students.

Notable alumni

References

External links
movillecc.ie

Educational institutions established in 2001
Secondary schools in County Donegal
2001 establishments in Ireland